Albert J. Carpenter (9 June 191121 June 1999) was an officer in the United States Coast Guard from 1933–1968.

Personal life
On 9 June 1911, Albert John Carpenter was born in Ely, Nevada.  The eldest child of Robert J. and Kate P. Carpenter,  he lived in Elko, Nevada and had three younger brothers: Louis R. (born ), Edward P., and Harry P..  As editor-in-chief of the yearbook (The Pohob), Carpenter graduated from Elko County High School in 1927, and then worked as an auditor for the Southern Pacific Railroad Company for two years.

Carpenter married Lucille Swenson (from Fullerton, Nebraska), and  the couple had one son, John Loder Carpenter (born 15 December 1944).  Carpenter died on 21 June 1999.

US Coast Guard career

Carpenter enrolled as a cadet at the United States Coast Guard Academy on 4 August 1930.  He graduated on 15 May 1933 with a Bachelor of Science, and was immediately commissioned an ensign.  From 1933–1938, Carpenter served aboard  out of Oakland, California;  out of Seattle; and  out of Seward, Alaska.

From June 1938 through September 1942, Carpenter taught mathematics and navigation at the Coast Guard Academy in New London, Connecticut.  From October 1942 to October 1943, the lieutenant commander ran the academy's Reserve Training School.  He then received command training at a Coast Guard base in St. Augustine, Florida and a US Navy base in Miami.  Carpenter was given command of  after its October 1944 commissioning, and led the ship on patrol out of the Canadian seaport Argentia in Newfoundland and Labrador.

Carpenter worked out of Coast Guard (USCG) headquarters (the Southern Railway Building) in Washington, D.C. from 1945–1949.  He then commanded  for a year before returning to USCG HQ in July 1950 for four more years.  After commanding  out of San Francisco from September 1954 through April 1956, Carpenter commanded the Mariannas Section through 1958.  Returning to DC to attend the National War College from August 1958June 1959, he then stayed in the US capital in several administrative positions for three more years.

A series of Coast Guard District (CGD) commands followed: the 8th CGD in New Orleans from 1962–1963; 2nd CGD in St. Louis from 1963–1966; 11th CGD in Long Beach, California from 1966–1967; and 3rd CGD in New York City from 1967–1968.  It was this last command from which Carpenter—on 1 July 1968— was involuntarily retired as a rear admiral.

References

1911 births
1999 deaths
military personnel from Nevada
people from Ely, Nevada
United States Coast Guard Academy alumni
United States Coast Guard admirals
United States Coast Guard personnel of World War II